Thiobenzophenone is an organosulfur compound with the formula (C6H5)2CS. It is the prototypical thioketone. Unlike other thioketones that tend to dimerize to form rings and polymers, thiobenzophenone is quite stable, although it photoxidizes in air to form benzophenone and sulfur. Thiobenzophenone is deep blue and dissolves readily in many organic solvents.

Structure
The C=S bond length of thiobenzophenone is 1.63 Å, which is comparable to 1.64 Å, the C=S bond length of thioformaldehyde, measured in the gas phase. Due to steric interactions, the phenyl groups are not coplanar and the dihedral angle SC-CC is 36°. A variety of thiones with structures and stability related to thiobenzophenone have also been prepared.

Synthesis
One of the first reported syntheses of thiobenzophenone involves the reaction of sodium hydrosulfide and diphenyldichloromethane": 
Ph2CCl2 + 2 NaSH → Ph2C=S + 2 NaCl + H2S

An updated method involves sulfiding of benzophenone: 
Ph2C=O + H2S → Ph2C=S + H2O

In the above reaction scheme, a mixture of gaseous hydrogen chloride and hydrogen sulfide are passed into a cooled solution of benzophenone in ethanol. Thiobenzophenone can also be produced by a Friedel-Crafts reaction of thiobenzoyl chloride and benzene.

Reactivity
Due to the weakness of the C=S bond, thiobenzophenone is more reactive than its C=O benzophenone counterpart.  Thiobenzophenone as well as other thioketones are considered to be superdipolarophiles and dienophiles that rapidly combine with 1,3-dienes in Diels-Alder cycloadditions. The rate of thioketones in cycloadditions is related but not limited to the size of the small HOMO/LUMO energy gap of the π-MOs of the C=S double bond. Reactions between thiobenzophenone and most dienes yield Diels-Alder adducts whereas reactions with monoolefins yield bicyclic compounds.

References 

Thioketones
Benzophenones